Hypocrea is a genus of fungi in the family Hypocreaceae. The widespread genus is estimated to contain 171 species that grow on rotten wood, and are often associated with other fungi. Anamorphic genera associated with Hypocrea include Acremonium, Gliocladium, Trichoderma, and Verticillium. Hypocrea was circumscribed by mycologist Elias Fries in 1825. Due to changes within the code of nomenclature, the genus Trichoderma has been proposed for conservation over its teleomorph Hypocrea. This means that all species with both a Hypocrea and Trichoderma name will be officially known by their Trichoderma name, and any species only described as Hypocrea will be transferred to Trichoderma.

Species

Hypocrea americana
Hypocrea andinensis
Hypocrea argillacea
Hypocrea atrogelatinosa
Hypocrea atroviridis
Hypocrea aurantia
Hypocrea aurantiaca
Hypocrea aureoviridis
Hypocrea austrokoningii
Hypocrea carnea
Hypocrea ceramica
Hypocrea cerebriformis
Hypocrea citrina
Hypocrea colensoi
Hypocrea coprosmae
Hypocrea cornea
Hypocrea corticioides
Hypocrea crassa
Hypocrea cremea
Hypocrea cupularis
Hypocrea dichromospora
Hypocrea dorotheae
Hypocrea egmontensis
Hypocrea eucorticioides
Hypocrea gelatinosa
Hypocrea hunua
Hypocrea jecorina
Hypocrea koningii
Hypocrea lactea
Hypocrea lacuwombatensis
Hypocrea lenta
Hypocrea lixii
Hypocrea lutea
Hypocrea macrospora
Hypocrea manuka
Hypocrea minutispora
Hypocrea muroiana
Hypocrea nebulosa
Hypocrea neorufa
Hypocrea nigricans
Hypocrea novae-zelandiae
Hypocrea orientalis
Hypocrea pachybasioides
Hypocrea pallida
Hypocrea parapilulifera
Hypocrea patella
Hypocrea pezizoides
Hypocrea phyllostachydis
Hypocrea pilulifera
Hypocrea placentula
Hypocrea poronioidea
Hypocrea protopulvinata
Hypocrea pseudokoningii
Hypocrea psychrophila
Hypocrea pulvinata
Hypocrea saccharina
Hypocrea schweinitzii
Hypocrea semiorbis
Hypocrea spinulosa
Hypocrea splendens
Hypocrea stellata
Hypocrea stilbohypoxyli
Hypocrea strictipilosa
Hypocrea strobilina
Hypocrea subalpina
Hypocrea sublibera
Hypocrea subsplendens
Hypocrea sulfurella
Hypocrea sulphurea
Hypocrea tawa
Hypocrea toro
Hypocrea tremelloides
Hypocrea vinosa
Hypocrea virens
Hypocrea viridescens

References

External links

Sordariomycetes genera
Hypocreaceae